Tams Bixby (1855-1922)  was best known for his work on the Dawes Commission, which was formed to formally enroll members of the Indian tribes that were to be allotted portions of the tribal lands in what would become Oklahoma, and prepare for the abolition of the tribal governments before the territories could be accepted as a state. Named as a commission member in 1893, he was elevated to chairman after Senator Dawes' death in 1903. In that position, he was the official custodian of over two million of acres of land whose ownership was being transferred from the tribes to individual members. The organization he led numbered at least 500 people and occupied a large special-purpose building erected in downtown Muskogee. Decades later, a Muskogee reporter wrote that he was, "... arguably the most important figure in Indian Territory."

Bixby retired from government service in 1906, after completing the bulk of the commission's assigned duties. He continued living in Muskogee, and resumed his original occupation, that of a newspaper man, which he continued until his own death in 1922.

Early years
Tams Bixby (1855-1922) was born to Bradford and Susan Bixby in Staunton, Virginia, probably on December 12, 1855. His family moved to Red Wing, Minnesota, where his father had bought a hotel and bakery in 1857. Bradford Bixby died there in 1873, leaving his widow and two sons, Tams and George to run the family business. According to his biography in the Encyclopedia of Oklahoma History and Culture (EOHC), Tams apparently was not interested in running a hotel and bakery, for by the 1880s he was already running two newspapers in Red Wing and had become quite involved in Republican Party politics. Bixby's rise in Minnesota's Republican Party was quite rapid. Not only did he become the state party chairman, but he was soon named as a private secretary to the first Republican Party governor. When that governor was elected to  the U. S. Senate, Bixby remained the private secretary for the next occupant of the governor's mansion.

Work for the Dawes Commission
In 1883, President Grover Cleveland appointed a commission for the Five Civilized Tribes  Its members included Judge Joseph A. Gill, Judge W. H. H. Clayton and Tams Bixby, to set up the machinery for electing delegates to the Constitutional Convention. This group of three men was also charged with subdividing the whole of Indian Territory into districts and precincts. Outside of incorporated cities, that had never before been done in Indian Territory. The commission would be known as the Dawes Commission in honor of Senator Henry L. Dawes, who had already been named as its chairman. President Cleveland subsequently appointed Tams Bixby as a member of the Dawes Commission. After Senator Dawes died in 1903, Bixby was promoted to chairman of the commission.

Move to Muskogee
Until Bixby took over, focus of the commission was on negotiating treaty obligations; so the commission staff was relatively small and worked out of field offices in each of the Nations. The next step was actually enrolling the members of each tribe and preparing the land for allotment to the individuals. Bixby knew that this would be a time-consuming process, and that the staff must be greatly enlarged and co-located. Several towns in Indian Territory expressed great interest in becoming the site for this new activity. However, Bixby had already decided that Muskogee would be his choice. It had already been chosen as the seat of most important activities between the tribes and the Federal government; and the best railroad connections. The main drawback was that it did not have a large enough building.

Bixby approached Doctor F. B. Fite, a leading resident of Muskogee, about obtaining funding for a new building. Fite passed the issue to the city council. To reduce cost, Bixby was willing to accept a frame structure, rather than brick construction. The building was constructed at the corner of Second Street and Okmulgee Avenue and housed 500 clerks working on appraisals of over two million acres of land. Decades later, Jonita Mullins, a reporter for the Muskogee Phoenix, wrote that during Bixby's 10-year tenure as head of the Dawes Commission, he was,"... arguably the most important figure in Indian Territory."

Retirement from Dawes Commission
When the Dawes Commission expired in July, 1905, Bixby was appointed as commissioner of the Five Civilized Tribes. He retired from government work in 1906 and returned to working in journalism, becoming the president of the Muskogee Daily Phoenix organization, which he bought outright in 1907. He then returned to his home state of Minnesota, operated a St. Paul newspaper and started a townsite development. He returned to Muskogee in 1910, resumed running the Daily Phoenix and bought the Muskogee Times-Democrat.

Personal 
Tams Bixby married Clara Mues in 1886. They had three sons Joel, Edson, and Tams, Jr.

Death
Bixby died in a Kansas City, Missouri, hospital while traveling from Muskogee to California on January 17, 1922. His body was sent to Muskogee, where a memorial service was held, during which the town was shut down for an hour. According to the Phoenix, hundreds of people stood outdoors in the cold as the local American Legion post escorted the casket to the railroad depot to board a train for Minnesota, where the body was interred in the Bixby family cemetery in Red Wing.

Notes

References 

1855 births
1922 deaths
Pre-statehood history of Oklahoma
People from Red Wing, Minnesota
Minnesota Republicans
Oklahoma Republicans
People from Muskogee, Oklahoma
People from Staunton, Virginia
Editors of Minnesota newspapers
Editors of Oklahoma newspapers